Romance of the Three Kingdoms ( Sānguóyănyì;  Saikyō bushō-den sangokuengi) is a 2009 animated television series based on the classic 14th century novel of the same name by Luo Guanzhong joint produced by the Beijing Huihuang Animation Company of China and Future Planet of Japan. It was broadcast in Japan starting April 2010.

Production
The series cost ¥650 million (US$7.8 million).

list of episodes 

 an oath of honor
 the luck of the Han royal family
 Dongtak punitive force
 a serious ploy
 the end of a round table
 early-morning ambition
 Yeopo and Yubi
 a ploy of relief bombs
 a complete battle
 a fallen hero
 the qualifications of a hero
 three conditions
 Breakthrough of the 5th Pavilion
 reunion at an old castle
 Battle of Kwando (Awards)
 Battle of Kwando
 an example of a third generation
 Military Resonance Appears
 the weatherman'since.
 Battle of Jangpanpa
 a war of words between the Red Cliff and the Resonance
 a red wall-a conspiracy
 Red Cliff - 100,000 Arrows
 a ruse of flesh and blood
 the red wall-the east wind
 a red wall-decision of victory
 the Confederate Army's
 Yu-bi's marriage award
 Yu-bi's marriage.
 the death of Zhou Yu
 get up on one's feet
 a map of Jangsong
 Liu Bei Enters the Kingdom of Qiu
 an armed eye
 a feast of conspiracy
 Battle of Jeonggun Mountain
 Liu Bei of Korea and China
 the death of a government employee
 the establishment of a country
 Liu Bei's will
 a fierce attack of the Southern Man.
 a ferocious brigade
 the peace of the south
 Northern Expedition
 Jijang Kangyu (a military commander)
 an empty castle
 Zhuge Liang vs Sama's...
 a monster soldier
 Game 6
 the winds of the five gardens
 Rebellion of Samaritanism
 My heroes.

References

External links

Chinese animated television series
China Central Television original programming
TV Tokyo original programming
Works based on Romance of the Three Kingdoms